EN 207 is a European norm for laser safety eyewear (now superseded, together with the EN 208, by the ISO 19818:2021 standard ). Any laser eye protection sold within the European Community must be certified and labeled with the CE mark. According to this standard, laser safety glasses should not only absorb laser light of a given wavelength, but they should also be able to withstand a direct hit from the laser without breaking or melting, both the filter and the frame. In this respect, the European norm is more strict than the American norm (ANSI Z 136) that only regulates the required optical density. More precisely, the safety glasses should be able to withstand a continuous wave laser for 5 seconds, or 50 pulses for a pulsed laser (EN 207:2017).

An EN 207 specification might read IR 315–532 LB6. Here, the letters IR indicate the laser working mode, in this case a pulsed mode. The range 315–532 indicates the wavelength range in nanometers. Finally, the scale number LB6 indicates a lower limit for the optical density, i.e. the transmittance within this wavelength range is less than 10−6.

Laser working modes

EN 207 specifies four laser working modes:

Scale numbers

The scale numbers range from LB1 to LB10, where the number is a lower
limit for the optical density, i.e. LBn means that OD > n, or
, where T is the transmittance. The
minimum scale number for a given laser with a beam diameter of 1 mm
depends on the working mode and the wavelength as follows (EN 207:2017):

If the beam diameter differs from 1 mm a correction factor, depending on the material of the filter and frame, must be applied.
Another correction factor must be used for pulsed lasers in case of repeated pulses for wavelengths above 400 nm.

Examples
 the laser operates at 1064 nm and has a pulse duration of 10 ns, 100 mJ/cm2 (or 103 J/m2). You have goggles that are specified as DIR 1064 LB5. The pulse duration indicates that we should look at the R specification, with scale number n=5, which gives an upper limit of 5×102 J/m2, which means that these goggles do not offer suitable protection for this particular laser.
 the laser operates at 780 nm, is continuous wave with a power of 50 mW/cm2 (P = 500 W/m2). In other words, the safety goggles should be at least D 780 LB2.
 such example can be found too 900 - 1070 D LB7 + IR LB8 + M LB8Y.The symbols have the same meaning as in the previous examples, just note on marking with Y: if the eye protection device has not been tested with low repetition frequencies (≤ 25 Hz), the protection level must be extended by the letter Y .

References

00207
Laser safety and standards